A Reference Card or "Romer" is a device for increasing the accuracy when reading a grid reference from a map. Made from transparent plastic, paper or other materials, they are also found on most baseplate compasses. Essentially, it is a specially marked-out ruler which matches the scale of the map in use. The scales are laid out in reverse, such that by lining up the numbers given in the grid reference with the gridlines for the square in question, the corner of the Romer lies on the location whose grid reference you wish to read. Some transparent versions have a small hole at the origin when this is not at the corner of the Reference Card. This allows access to the map such that the location could be marked with a pencil if using the Reference Card in reverse having been given a grid reference to start with. They are used in many types of land navigation and map reading, to give a more accurate grid reference than one just estimated by eye from the grid lines on the map.

While Romers of various designs are available commercially, they can easily be made yourself; by hand, by using a computer or by finding a website with instructions.

Invented in 1915 by Temporary Lieutenant (later Captain) Carrol Romer, MC, RE (1883-1951), then “Maps”, First Army: i.e. OC Maps and Printing Section, such Reference Cards were widely used by the British Army in WW1 and after, being described in a Maps GHQ booklet Maps and Artillery Boards in December 1916: the name "Romer" seems only to have been used officially from 1929.
  
A version was later developed for car navigational rallies by car rally partners Eric Gardner and John Cridford during the early 1950s, the 'Garford Romer' was available for both Imperial and Metric OS maps and is still sold today. Although a registered design when it was first made and sold it was and still is much copied.

The illustration shows how the Romer is used. Here, we are plotting the reference 696018. The marks corresponding to (6, 8) on the Romer are lined up along the gridlines (69, 01). The hole near the corner yields the exact point, the church at Little Plumpton.

 Protractor

References

Cartography
Navigation
Road rallying